Barholm  is a village in the South Kesteven district of Lincolnshire, England.

Barholm is first recorded as "Berc(a)ham" in 1086; the name is from Old English beorg + hām or hamm and means "homestead or enclosure on a hill."

Hereward (later known as Hereward the Wake) owned land in Barholm and the nearby village of Stowe in the period before the Norman conquest in 1066.

St Martin's Church is Grade I listed. The church received a new tower during the English Civil War and an inscription with the date 1648 reads:

"Was ever such a thing
Since the Creation?
A new steeple built
In the time of vexation."

Local government
Barholm and Stowe is a civil parish. It is run through a parish meeting of its residents rather than a parish council, two district councillors who represent Casewick Ward on South Kesteven District Council and a county councillor representing Deepings West & Rural Division on Lincolnshire County Council. The district councillors elected in May 2011 and re-elected in 2015 are Kelham Cooke (Con) and Rosemary Trollope-Bellew (Con). The county councillor elected in 2017 is Rosemary Trollope-Bellew (Con).

References

External links
 
 

Villages in Lincolnshire
South Kesteven District